Shalini Shah (b May 17) is a National Film Award-winning filmmaker; a film faculty member at Kumaun University; and the artistic-director/co-founder of the Kautik International Film Festival, Nainital, Uttrakhand.

Awards
Recipient of the National Film Award for Best Historical Reconstruction/Compilation Film for her film 'From the land of Buddhism to the Land of Buddha'. Citation: For its realistic and pictorial depiction of the culture, traditions and socio-economic conditions of the Tibetans settled in India.

Member of the Jury 
 49th National Film Awards
 IFFI-2005 
 Chalachitram National Film Festival-2020

References 

Living people
Indian filmmakers
Year of birth missing (living people)